The Journal of Urban Economics is a bimonthly peer-reviewed academic journal covering urban economics. It is considered the premier journal in the field of urban economics. It was established in 1974 and is published by Elsevier. The editors-in-chief are Stuart Rosenthal (Syracuse University) and Nathaniel Baum-Snow (University of Toronto). According to the Journal Citation Reports, the journal has a 2020 impact factor of 3.637.

References

External links

Urban economics
Economics journals
Elsevier academic journals
Publications established in 1974
Bimonthly journals
English-language journals